Chei may refer to:

People
 Chei or Chae, Korean surname
 Chei Byung-yong (born 1982), South Korean baseball player

Places
 Bicaz-Chei, Romania

Other
 Cholinesterase inhibitor